This is a list of neurologists and neurosurgeons, with their year of birth and death and nationality. This list compiles the names of neurologists and neurosurgeons with a corresponding Wikipedia biographical article, and is not necessarily a reflection of their relative importance in the field. Many neurologists and neurosurgeons are considered to be neuroscientists as well and some neurologists are also in the list of psychiatrists.

See also
 History of neurology and neurosurgery
Neurology
List of neuroscientists
List of women neuroscientists
Neurosurgery
Head injury
Brain damage

Bibliography 
 Webb Haymaker and Francis Schiller: The Founders of Neurology: One Hundred and Forty-Six Biographical Sketches. Springfield, Ill., Charles Thomas, 1970.
 Kurt Kolle (edit.): Grosse Nervenärzte, 1-3 Vol., Stuttgart, Georg Thieme, 1963-1970.

 
History of neurology
Neurosurgeons
Lists of natural scientists
Lists of health professionals
Lists of physicians